Rhos means 'moor' or 'moorland' in Welsh. It is a region to the east of the River Conwy in north Wales. It started as a minor kingdom then became a medieval cantref, and was usually part of the Kingdom of Gwynedd (later the region became part of Denbighshire, then Clwyd, and is now in Conwy county borough).

Kingdom: history and archaeology

Rhos is identified as a small kingdom during the sub-Roman and early medieval periods in an Old Welsh genealogical document ‘Ancestry of the Kings and Princes of Wales’ listing thirteen of its kings (including two who are known to have ruled the wider region of Gwynedd).

The most famous monarch was perhaps Cynlas Goch, the son of Owain Ddantgwyn, who lived in the early 6th century and was denounced by the monk, Gildas. He wrote (in Latin) that Cynlas was the “guider of the chariot which is the receptacle of the bear“. The latter may refer to a “Fort of the Bear”, possibly  Dinerth, the name of a hillfort on Bryn Euryn in Llandrillo-yn-Rhos. The road that runs below the western side of the hill is still called Dinerth Road and Dinarth Hall is nearby.

The Gwynedd Archaeological Trust have undertaken a trial excavation of this hillfort and set up related information boards in Colwyn Bay Library. Their investigations revealed a massive defensive stone wall, well built and faced with good-quality limestone blocks originally rising to about ten feet high. The ramparts were eleven and a half feet thick. These defences are unlike those of Iron Age hillforts but comparable with similar medieval fortifications, so may represent a possible stronghold of the Kings of Rhos.

Administrative unit
By the 11th century, Rhos was part of Gwynedd Is Conwy (Gwynedd "below" the River Conwy) as an administrative unit known as a cantref. Along with its three adjoining cantrefi, the area was known as Y Berfeddwlad or the 'Middle Country' lying between Gwynedd and Powys and often changing hands between those two powerful kingdoms. With the loss of Welsh independence in 1283, Rhos became part of the lordship of Denbigh, as granted to the English Earl of Lincoln. The cantrefi were abolished in 1536 with the creation of Denbighshire, but the name of Rhos survives today in places such as Llandrillo-yn-Rhos (Rhos-on-Sea), Llanelian-yn-Rhos, and Penmaen Rhos.

Commotes
Creuddyn was a historic commote of Rhos, then later of Caernarfonshire.

See also
Roose Hundred

References

External links

Cantrefs
Commotes of Gwynedd
History of Conwy County Borough
Kingdoms of Wales
States and territories established in the 5th century
5th century in Wales